Downtown is an American animated series and sitcom on MTV on urban life, based on interviews with real people. The show, created by Chris Prynoski, follows a diverse and multiracial cast who live in New York City, and presents their everyday lives. In 2000, Downtown was nominated for a Primetime Emmy Award for Outstanding Animated Program for the episode "Before and After".

Downtown aired 13 episodes from August to November 1999.

Cast 
Gregory Gilmore as Alex Hensen
Leyora Zuberman as Chaka Hensen
Marco H. Rodriguez as Fruity
Scot Rienecker as Scott ("Goat")
Tammy Lang as Jen
Hector Fontanez as Matt
Aurora Lucia-Levey as Mecca
Phoebe Summersquash as Serena
Rosanna Plasencia as Leah

Episodes

Reception 
Sarah Nechamkin of Interview, called Downtown “the best piece of discarded treasure to come out of the glorious trove of ’90s MTV”. In a retrospective review for Vulture, Greta Rainbow called it a “feat of naturalistic dialogue”, describing the series as a “hyperspecific time capsule”.

References

External links
 

1990s American adult animated television series
1990s American sitcoms
1999 American television series debuts
1999 American television series endings
American adult animated comedy television series
American animated sitcoms
English-language television shows
MTV cartoons
Teen animated television series
Television series created by George Krstic
Television series created by Chris Prynoski
Television shows set in New York City